Julie Foster is a Canadian rugby union player who participated in three World Cups (1998, 2002, and 2006).
 Foster also represented Hockey Canada in a two-game series against the United States in 1993.

Born in Winnipeg, Manitoba in 1969, Foster spent her rugby career in Saskatchewan. Early coaches include Leanne Balliett and Kirsten Karwandy. Foster's introduction to rugby began with the Regina Breakers in 1991. That same year she represented Saskatchewan Rugby until 2012. In 2008, she was a founding member of the Regina Rage RFC. Foster also played on the Dog River Howlers and Prairie Fire Ultra Sevens invitational sides.

Foster's first cap was against New Zealand in 1996, though her most memorable game was at her first Canada cup in 1996 when she scored three tries. She scored her first try at the 200 Can-Am test match.  The winger also played on the first national sevens team at the 1997 Hong Kong Sevens and earned 10 caps with the program. During her decade long international career, came to an end in a match versus France.

Foster has been an active coach in high school rugby since 1995, while also coaching the under-16 and under-18 at the 2012 and 2018 Western Canadian Championships, respectively. Since 2008, has coached at the club level with the Regina Rage. From 2013 to 2015, she coached the Saskatchewan women's team (one year combined with the Manitoba squad). Since 2012, Foster has coached at the university level with the Regina Cougars women's 7s side. Her fiancé Darren Beaulac coaches the Saskatchewan Women under-18 side; they have a son together.

Foster now works for the Regina Qu'Appelle Health Region.

Honours and awards
 2000, CIS All Star Ice hockey honours, University of Regina
 2001, Isobel Gathorne-Hardy Award (ice hockey) recipient
 2011, Colette McAuley award
 2019, Rugby Canada Hall of Fame inductee

References

Living people
Canadian female rugby union players
Canada women's international rugby union players
1969 births
Sportspeople from Winnipeg
Canadian women's ice hockey players